No Smoke, No Mirrors is British band The Holloways' second studio album, released on 5 October 2009. It includes the single "Jukebox Sunshine" which was released prior to the album on 28 September 2009. It was greeted with mixed reviews including a poor review from NME and a positive review from IndieLondon. One journalist named it Pop Album of the Year.

Track listing
 "AAA"
 "Public Service Broadcast"
 "On the Bus"
 "Jukebox Sunshine"
 "Sinners 'n' Winners"
 "Under a Cloud"
 "Cooldown"
 "Alcohol"
 "Listen"
 "Little Johnny Went to Parliament"
 "Knock Me Down"

References

2009 albums
The Holloways albums